The 1928 Oregon Webfoots football team represented the University of Oregon in the Pacific Coast Conference (PCC) during the 1928 college football season.  In their third season under head coach John McEwan, the Webfoots compiled a 9–2 record (4–2 against PCC opponents), finished in fourth place in the PCC, and outscored their opponents, 234 to 59. The team played its home games at Hayward Field in Eugene, Oregon.

Schedule

References

Oregon
Oregon Ducks football seasons
Oregon Webfoots football